Geeta Mahalik (born 1948) is an Indian Odissi dancer. The Government of India honoured her with the Padma Shri in 2014 for her services to the field of art and culture.

Biography
Gita Mahalik began her training at a very early age from renowned guru, Deba Prasad Dash. This was followed by coaching under Mayadhar Raut which helped Geeta to develop a style which many connoisseurs described as sheer poetry in motion.

Geeta has travelled extensively, performing in many countries across the globe like France, Switzerland, China, Italy, Spain, USA, Canada, Germany, Portugal, Greece and many other countries in the African continent. She has also performed at almost all of the major dance festivals in India, Khajuraho Dance Festival, Ellora Dance Festival, Elephanta Dance Festival, Konarak Dance Festival, Mahabalipuram Festival, Mukteshwar Dance Festival, Badri Kedar Utsav, Taj Festival, Kalidas Samaroh at Ujjain, Ganga Mahotsav and Mandu Festival featuring among them.

Geeta Mahalik presently lives in Delhi.

Legacy
Geeta Mahalik is generally credited with giving a national flavor to the traditional style of Odissi. She is also widely known to be a master of 'Rasa' (expression).

Geeta has choreographed many dance dramas such as Lavanyavati, Krishnabhilasha and Draupadi - Antim Prashna which have won critical acclaim. It is reported that she has brought in many innovative interpretations and religious and secular overtones through her choreography.

Geeta Mahalik has founded a non-governmental organization, Geeta's Upasana, based in Delhi, for promoting arts and culture, especially odissi dance. The organization regularly stages performances in Delhi and outside.

Positions
 Founder Director - Geeta's Upasana
 Member - Expert Committee on Odissi dance - Ministry of Culture
 Member - General Council - Sangeet Natak Akademi
 Member - General Council - Odisha Sangeet Natak Akademi

Awards and recognitions
 Padma Shri - Government of India - 2014
 Kendra Sangeet Natak Akademi Award - 2010
 Odisha Sangeet Natak Akademi Award - 2012
 Gramini Award - India International Rural Cultural Centre
 Senior National Fellowship - Ministry of Culture, Government of India

Geeta Mahalik is on the artists panel of the Indian Council for Cultural Relations.

References

External links
 Interview in Shillong Times0
 World record Odissi performance featuring 555 dancers

1948 births
Living people
People from Koraput
Recipients of the Padma Shri in arts
Performers of Indian classical dance
Odissi exponents
Recipients of the Sangeet Natak Akademi Award
Indian female classical dancers
20th-century Indian dancers
20th-century Indian women artists
Dancers from Odisha
Women artists from Odisha